James William Anson  (9 January 1915 — 14 January 1995) was an English first-class cricketer and businessman.

Anson was born in British India at Mardan in January 1915. He was educated in Scotland at Fettes College, before matriculating to Caius College, Cambridge. After graduating from Cambridge, he went to British India where he worked in the shipping industry. While in India, he played first-class cricket on six occasions from 1938 to 1947. His first two appearances came for Sind in the Ranji Trophy, with his remaining four matches coming for the personal eleven's of Sir Homi Mehta and K. C. Ibrahim. In his six matches, he scored 162 runs at an average of 16.20, with a highest score of 49. Prior to going to India, he had played second eleven cricket for Kent from 1933 to 1936. During the Second World War, he was emergency commissioned with the rank of second lieutenant into the British Indian Army as of 25 June 1940. Anson was later made a CBE in the 1969 Birthday Honours, as which point he was the managing director of Mackinnon Mackenzie and Company in Bombay. He returned to England in his later life, where he died at Maidstone in January 1995. His brother, Kenneth, was also a first-class cricketer.

References

External links

1915 births
1995 deaths
Cricketers from Mardan
People educated at Fettes College
Alumni of Gonville and Caius College, Cambridge
English businesspeople in shipping
English cricketers
Sindh cricketers
Indian Army personnel of World War II
British Indian Army officers
Commanders of the Order of the British Empire